Volodymyr Mykhailovych Lytvyn (born April 28, 1956) is a Ukrainian politician best known for being Chairman of the Verkhovna Rada, the Ukrainian parliament. Having previously served in that position from 2002 until 2006, he was re-elected in December 2008 after his party agreed to join the former coalition of Yulia Tymoshenko in an expanded capacity and stayed Chairman until December 2012. From 1994 to 1999, Lytvyn was the aide to President Leonid Kuchma and, later, the head of his office.

Early biography and private life

Lytvyn was born in Sloboda-Romanivska village in the Novohrad-Volynskyi Raion of the Zhytomyr Oblast. Lytvyn graduated from the Kyiv University (Faculty of History) in 1978. In 1984, he defended his dissertation "Efforts of the Communist Party of Ukraine in improving the preparation of teachers in social disciplines".

Lytvyn started his career at the Kyiv State University (1978−86), then he worked as Head of Directorate in the Ministry of Higher and Secondary Vocational Training of the Ukrainian SSR (1986−89). Between 1989 and 1991 he worked as a political analyst at the Central Committee of the Communist Party of Ukraine, the Ukrainian branch of CPSU.

Lytvyn is a correspondent member of the National Academy of Sciences of Ukraine, Honored Worker of Sciences and Technology of Ukraine. However, in 2002 he was publicly and reasonably accused of plagiarizing a Western scholar when writing his article to Dzerkalo Tyzhnia newspaper.

He is married to Tetyana Kostyantynivna (born 1960), an economist. Their daughter Olena (born 1982) is a beauty industry entrepreneur, and their son Ivan (born 1989) is a student.

Lytvyn's hobbies include reading, football, and taking care of dalmatian dogs.

Political career

Head of the Presidential Administration
In 1994, Lytvyn became the aide to the newly elected President Leonid Kuchma. In 1999, he was appointed as the head of the Presidential Administration.

Gongadze murder
During the Cassette Scandal audiotapes were released on which Kuchma, Lytvyn and other top-level administration officials are allegedly heard discussing the need to silence Georgiy Gongadze for his online news reports about high-level corruption. Gongadze's decapitated body was found in the suburbs of Kyiv in November 2000. In 2000, Mykola Melnychenko released a secretly-taped recording allegedly of a conversation between Kuchma and Lytvyn in which the two discussed getting rid of Gongadze. Lytvyn is alleged to have said that Kuchma should "let loose [Interior Minister] Kravchenko to use alternative methods" on Gongadze. Lytvyn denied the allegation, saying that the tape was a fabrication. Independent experts who have analysed the tapes are divided as to their authenticity. Gongadze was found beheaded in a shallow grave in 2000. In 2005, Kravchenko was found dead with two bullets in his head. Official investigations concluded that he had committed suicide and that he had ordered Gongadze's murder. Lytvyn stated "The investigation confirmed my innocence in this case, despite the fact that efforts have been, are being and will be taken to make me practically the main person accused [of killing the journalist]".

During the 2011—2013 trial of Oleksiy Pukach, Pukach claimed that (former) Ukrainian President Leonid Kuchma and Lytvyn (at the time of the murder Kuchma's head of his Presidential Administration) had ordered the murder of Gongadze.

Parliamentary career

In 2002, Lytvyn was elected to Verkhovna Rada as the head of the party bloc For United Ukraine ("Za edynu Ukrainu"). He became the Chairman of the Verkhovna Rada (speaker) of the legislature as a compromising figure among the parliamentary factions.

Lytvyn refused to take part in the presidential election of 2004 despite his significant political influence.

Lytvyn's brother, Mykola Lytvyn was the chief of Ukraine's Border Guard.

Lytvyn is known for his ironic political expressions. One of his best-known sentences is "I do not protest at forming an artificial majority in our parliament. But I want this majority to include every member of parliament."

At the parliamentary elections on March 26, 2006, his Lytvyn's People's Bloc won 2.44% of the popular vote and no seats since it did not meet the 3 percent threshold. Lytvyn's allies (together with other parties) declared the voting results forged, filing a court suit and starting a public campaign. However, Lytvyn himself avoids press and shows deep disappointment since the results announced. Elected vice-chairman NAN.

In the early parliamentary election held on September 30, 2007, the Lytvyn Bloc (renamed from Lytvyn's People's Bloc) consisted of the People's Party and the Labour Party. The bloc placed fifth with 20 out of 450 seats.

2010 presidential election, and 2012–14 parliamentary elections
On December 6, 2009, Mykola Melnychenko, former bodyguard to Kuchma, accused Lytvyn of ordering the murder of journalist Georgiy Gongadze in 2000. A spokesperson for Lytvyn dismissed the claims as part of the 2010 Ukrainian presidential election campaign. During the election Lytvyn received 2,35% of the votes.

Lytvyn took part in the 2012 Ukrainian parliamentary election as a People's Party candidate in single-member districts number 65 (first-past-the-post wins a parliament seat) located in Narodychi Raion. He won a parliamentary seat by winning this constituency. Lytvyn did not join any parliamentary faction after taking his seat.

In the 2014 parliamentary election Lytvyn was re-elected into parliament as an independent candidate in electoral district 65 located in Zviahel with 41.48% of the votes. In parliament, he joined the parliamentary group People's Will until he was asked to leave it on 19 October 2017.

2019 parliamentary elections and end of political career
In the 2019 Ukrainian parliamentary election Lytvyn lost his parliamentary seat after losing his constituency. He gained 25.65% of the votes, while the winner Dmytro Kostiuk of the Servant of the People party scored 35.73%.

In March 2021 Lytvyn lost in the election for the rector of the Taras Shevchenko National University of Kyiv, taking fourth place with a result of about 4% of the vote. The next day he resigned as chairman of the supervisory board of this university.

Family
 Father, Mykhailo Klymovych (1930)
 Mother, Olha Andriivna (1929)
 Brothers
 Mykola Lytvyn (1961), General of the Army, Border Troops commander
 Petro Lytvyn, a commander of the Southern Operational Command of Ukrainian Ground Forces

Awards
Volodymyr Lytvyn was bestowed upon the following awards:
 Hero of Ukraine (2004)
 State Prize in Science and Technology (1999)
 Distinguished Scientists of Ukraine (1998)

See also
 Ukraine without Kuchma
 Orange Revolution

References

 Question mark is the freedom's coat of arms (Zerkalo Nedeli's first analysis of the Cassette Scandal, including quotations from the recordings; 2000) 
 Seven myths (2002 article in Zerkalo Nedeli, including accusations of copyright violation supposedly committed by Lytvyn) 
 The sacred cows can only be found in India (Lytvyn's reply to the preceding contribution, also in Zerkalo Nedeli)

External links
 
  

1956 births
Living people
People from Zhytomyr Oblast
Independent politicians of For United Ukraine!
People's Party (Ukraine) politicians
Fourth convocation members of the Verkhovna Rada
Sixth convocation members of the Verkhovna Rada
Seventh convocation members of the Verkhovna Rada
Eighth convocation members of the Verkhovna Rada
Chairmen of the Verkhovna Rada
Candidates in the 2010 Ukrainian presidential election
Taras Shevchenko National University of Kyiv alumni
Recipients of the title of Hero of Ukraine
Commanders of the Order of Merit of the Republic of Poland
2003 Tuzla Island conflict
Head of the Presidential Administration of Ukraine
21st-century Ukrainian politicians
Laureates of the State Prize of Ukraine in Science and Technology